Casa Vidal is a house located at Avinguda Carlemany, 59, Escaldes-Engordany Parish, Andorra. It is a heritage property registered in the Cultural Heritage of Andorra. It was built in 1946.

References

Escaldes-Engordany
Houses in Andorra
Houses completed in 1946
Cultural Heritage of Andorra